WDDD may refer to:

 WDDD-FM, a radio station (107.3 FM) licensed to Johnston City, Illinois, United States
 WDDD (AM), a defunct radio station (810 AM) formerly licensed to Johnston City, Illinois, United States